Air Putih may refer to:

 Air Putih (Penang state constituency)
 Air Putih (Terengganu state constituency)